Carson Amanda "Carsie" Blanton (born July 22, 1985) is an American singer-songwriter based in Philadelphia, who performs on guitar. Blanton has released eight studio albums and three EPs, all with a "pay what you please" pricing strategy. Blanton wrote "My true calling as an artist is to share…What I actually want to do is make beautiful music and then give it to everyone, regardless of what they give me back."

Fresh Air called Blanton "one of those hard-headed open-hearted protestors who can make revolution sound desirable to your body, even if your mind wants to resist it", in reference to her 2021 album, Love and Rage.

Early life
Carsie Blanton grew up on a former cattle farm in Luray, Virginia. She was a student of unschooling. She began taking piano lessons at age 6, and playing guitar and writing songs at age 13. In 2002, at age 16, Blanton went to live in a group house with other artists and musicians in Eugene, Oregon. In Eugene, she sang back-up vocals for a touring funk band and took up swing dancing.

Career
In 2005, Blanton recorded and self-released her first studio album Ain't So Green, produced by Steve Van Dam of Everything. In 2006, Blanton relocated from Eugene to Philadelphia to pursue her music career full-time. She began working with manager Bill Eib (Amos Lee, Mutlu Onaral), and by 2007 she was playing over 100 live shows a year.

Beginning in 2010, Blanton performed as a support act for The Wood Brothers on multiple tours in the United States, Germany, and The Netherlands.  Oliver Wood produced Blanton's 2012 album Idiot Heart. In 2011, she toured with Anaïs Mitchell's Hadestown, playing the role of Head Fate. That year Blanton also opened several shows on Paul Simon's So Beautiful or So What tour.

In 2012, Blanton relocated to New Orleans, where she lived until moving back to the Philadelphia area in 2020.

In 2019, she released Buck Up, which Ken Tucker, reviewing the album for NPR's Fresh Air, called "delightfully surprising".

In 2020 and 2021, during the COVID-19 pandemic, Blanton supported herself and her band by playing monthly online Rent Parties.  In 2021, Blanton released Love & Rage, an album of "anti-fascist anthems" produced by Tyler Chester. Her latest album (also produced by Chester), Body of Work, is slated to be released one song per month throughout 2022.

Blanton's albums have all been released independently. She receives direct support from her fans on Patreon and Kickstarter. She typically performs live with her trio, sometimes called the Handsome Band, which includes Joe Plowman on bass and Patrick Firth on keyboards.

Discography

References

External links

[  Carsie Blanton] at Allmusic

1985 births
Living people
American women composers
21st-century American composers
American women singer-songwriters
American folk guitarists
American folk singers
People from Luray, Virginia
People from Bethesda, Maryland
Singer-songwriters from Virginia
21st-century American women guitarists
21st-century American guitarists
Guitarists from Virginia
21st-century American women singers
21st-century women composers